Cerconota bathyphaea is a moth in the family Depressariidae. It was described by Edward Meyrick in 1932. It is found in Panama.

References

Moths described in 1932
Cerconota
Taxa named by Edward Meyrick